Negură Bunget was a black metal band from Timișoara, Romania whose atmospheric sound incorporated elements of progressive metal and Romanian folk music.

Biography
Negură Bunget originally formed at the end of 1994 under the name Wiccan Rede, as a duo of Negru (Gabriel Mafa) on drums and Hupogrammos Disciple (Edmond Karban) on guitars, vocals, and keyboards. Both musicians had previously been members of Makrothumia. Wiccan Rede released one demo, 1995's From Transilvanian Forests, before changing their name to Negură Bunget. In a 2004 interview, Negru explained the symbolism of the name: 

The band's debut album, Zîrnindu-să, was released in 1996. In 1997, guitarist Sol Faur (Cristian Popescu) joined the group. As a trio, they released a demo, several EPs and three more full-length albums - Măiastru Sfetnic, 'N Crugu Bradului and OM.

The success of Măiastru Sfetnic (2000) secured the band a three-album contract with the Code666 label. Reaching a wider audience, they undertook their first European tours.

N Crugu Bradului (2002) included four songs spanning a total of nearly an hour. The band described the album as:

In 2006, Negură Bunget released OM, garnering significant attention from the extreme music press; for example, it was ranked as the second best album of 2006 by the writers of the British Terrorizer Magazine.

Drummer Negru (also the chief editor of the Central European ideological magazine Negura Music) began a side project, Din Brad (meaning "from the fir tree"), in 2008. although their first (and to date, only) album Dor was not released until 2012.

In 2009, Negură Bunget splintered due to unreconcilable disagreements between the three members. Both Hupogrammos and Sol Faur left and formed Dordeduh, while drummer Negru continued under the name of Negură Bunget with an array of new lineups.

The band's first new album since the lineup change, 2010's Vîrstele Pămîntului, was also released in a limited special edition version. Each of the 555 copies, handmade to order, consisted of a handcrafted, roped wooden box with a burned finish containing an undisclosed amount of genuine soil from Transylvania, a poster, pin and deluxe digipack edition of the CD itself.

Also in 2010, the band released Măiestrit, a newly rerecorded version of Măiastru Sfetnic. They released an EP, Poarta De Dincolo, in 2011, as well as Focul Viu, a live DVD and album recorded and filmed in Bucharest in January 2008 with the classic trio lineup and backing musicians.

Negru reshuffled the band's lineup completely again in 2013. He explained the band's structural arrangement thus: 

The band issued a two-song 7" single, "Gînd A-prins", in 2013.

Negură Bunget's sixth studio album, Tău, was announced in 2013 as the first part of a planned "Transylvanian Trilogy". It was released on 27 February 2015 by Prophecy Productions sublabel Lupus Lounge.

The band's seventh album, Zi, was released on 30 September 2016 by Lupus Lounge.

Negru died on 21 March 2017, aged 42, leaving the band without any original members, and effectively ending the group.

On 7 December 2018, the band announced on their Facebook page that the third installment of the "Transylvanian Trilogy", left unfinished following Negru's death, was finally going to be completed and released at some point in 2019, as a tribute to Negru. With Negru's leftover drum tracks, the remaining members worked on completing the album Zău, which was released, two years later, on November 26, 2021.

Band members

Former members
Negru (Gabriel Mafa) - drums, percussion (1995–2017), dulcimer, horns, xylophone (2002–2017) (died 2017)
Hupogrammos Disciple (Edmond Karban) - vocals, guitar, bass, keyboards (1995-2009), flute, horns (2002-2009)
Sol Faur (Cristian Popescu) - guitar, bass, keyboards, backing vocals (1998-2005, 2006-2009)
Ageru Pământului - percussion, nai, flute, xylophone, archaic instruments, vocals (2009-2012)
Inia Dinia - keyboards (2006-2013)
Gadinet (Cătălin Motorga) - bass, nai, flute (2009-2013)
Spin - guitar (2009-2010)
Corb (Alex G. Mihai) - vocals, guitar, dulcimer (2009-2010)
Urzit - guitar (2010-2013)
Fulmineos - guitar, vocals (2010-2013)
Chakravartin (Stefan Zaharescu)- vocals (2012-2013)
Vartan Garabedian - percussion, vocals (2013–2016)
Mtz (Mihai Neagoe) - sound design (2013–2016)
Tibor Kati - vocals, guitar, keyboards, programming (2013–2017, 2018–2021)
OQ (Adrian Neagoe) - guitar, vocals, keyboards (2013–2017, 2018–2021)
Petrică Ionuţescu - nai, flute, horns (2013–2017, 2018–2021)
Ovidiu Corodan - bass (2013–2017, 2018–2021)
Daniel Dorobanţu - visual design (2013–2017, 2018–2021)

Former live members
Trunks (Dumitrescu Ionuţ) - bass 
Diana Karban - keyboards
Gabi Karban - keyboards, bass (1996-2007)
Daniel Dorobanțu - keyboards (1997–1998)
Ursu - bass (1999–2007)
Necuratul - percussion (2000-2003)
Andrei Popa - bass, guitar (2005)
Iedera - keyboards (2005–2006)
Alin Drimuș - nai, pipes, wooden flute (2006)
Arioch - bass (2007-2009)
Olivian Mihalcea - guitar, nai, wooden flute, pipes (2016)

Timeline

Discography

Studio albums
 Zîrnindu-să (1996)
 Măiastru Sfetnic (2000)
 'N Crugu Bradului (2002)
 OM (2006)
 Măiestrit (2010) (re-recording of Măiastru Sfetnic)
 Vîrstele Pamîntului (2010)
 Tău (2015)
 Zi (2016)
 Zău (2021)

Singles and EPs
 Sala Molksa (1998)
 Inarborat Kosmos (2005)
 Poarta de Dincolo (2011)
 Gînd A-prins (2013)

Demos
 From Transilvanian Forest as Wiccan Rede (1995)

Live albums
Focul Viu (2011)

Box sets
 Negură Bunget Box (2004)

References

External links
Negură Bunget official website
 Negură Bunget Music
Code666 Records
Prophecy/Lupus Lounge Records
Interview with Negru (Negură Bunget) 2013

Romanian black metal musical groups
Musical groups established in 1994
Romanian folk metal musical groups
Post-metal musical groups
1994 establishments in Romania
Musicians from Timișoara